Platinum is a song by American rapper Snoop Dogg, released as the third promotional single from his eleventh studio album Doggumentary. The song features guest vocals from R&B singer R. Kelly, and is produced by American producer Lex Luger.

Release
The song was released on February 22, 2011 as a promotional single, although it reached Number 62 at Billboard Hot R&B/Hip-Hop Songs.

Chart performance

References

Snoop Dogg songs
R. Kelly songs
Songs written by R. Kelly
2011 songs
Songs written by Snoop Dogg
Songs written by Lex Luger (musician)